Bertry is a commune in the Nord, which is known as the most populous department in northern France. Bertry station has rail connections to Douai and Saint-Quentin.

Population

Heraldry

See also
Communes of the Nord department

References

Communes of Nord (French department)